KBAP 88.1 FM is a radio station licensed to Batesville, Arkansas.  The station broadcasts a Contemporary Christian music format and is owned by Tony V. Hammack Ministries.

References

External links
KBAP's official website

Contemporary Christian radio stations in the United States
BAP